The Tłı̨chǫ people, sometimes spelled Tlicho  and also known as the Dogrib, are a Dene First Nations people of the Athabaskan-speaking ethnolinguistic group living in the Northwest Territories of Canada.

Name 
The name Dogrib is an English adaptation of their own name,  (or ) – “Dog-Flank People”, referring to their fabled descent from a supernatural dog-man. Dene People"). On the 1682 Franquelin map, Dogrib was recorded as "Alimousp[i]goiak" (from Cree , "Dog-Flanks").

Communities 
Tłı̨chǫ people have now six settlements or settlements with mostly of Tłı̨chǫ residents: Behchoko (formerly Rae-Edzo), Whatì (Lac la Martre), Gamèti (Rae Lakes), Wekweeti (Snare Lake), Dettah, and Ndilǫ (Rainbow Valley) (a subcommunity of Yellowknife, known by the Tłįchǫ as  – "where the money is").

The  or Dogrib language belongs to the Athabaskan languages, which are part of the Na-Dené languages family. The dialect spoken in the communities of Dettah and Ndilǫ developed from intermarriage between Yellowknives and Tłįchǫ.

Treaty Process

Yellowknife B Band (Treaty No. 8 Dogrib) 
In June 1899, negotiation began on Treaty No. 8, which covered 840,000 square kilometers in the Northwest Territory. It was an agreement between the Canadian Government and the Dene groups in the area in question; in return for their willingness to share their land with non-Natives, the Dene would receive medical and educational assistance, as well as treaty payments. The Canadian Government and the various Dene groups, including  Yellowknives and Tłįchǫ under chief Drygeese with headmen Benaiyah and Sek'eglinan, signed the treaty in 1900 at Fort Resolution (called by the Tłįchǫ Įndàà). After the signing, the group that signed the treaty was called the "Yellowknife B Band" (Helm, 7: 1994). At that point in history, Treaty No.8 was the largest land settlement the Canadian Government had ever made (PWNHC, Historical).

Dog Rib Rae Band (Treaty No. 11 Dogrib) 
Twenty years after Treaty No. 8 was signed, oil was discovered in the Mackenzie River Valley. Upon the discovery, the Canadian Government proposed another treaty that would clear the way for miners and development of the area. The treaty was greatly debated, as the Natives did not want to lose their right to hunt, fish, gather, and trap in the area. They also opposed being "confined to Indian reserves." Many Dene felt that Treaty No. 8 was not honored by the Canadian Government, and some were afraid that this treaty would turn out similarly. Nevertheless, Treaty No. 11 was signed by the Tłįchǫ trading chief Monfwi in the summer of 1921. The Tłįchǫ groups that signed this treaty were then known as the "Dog Rib Rae Band" (Helm, 7: 1994), constituting the majority of the Tłįchǫ population. Both Treaty No. 8 and Treaty No. 11 overlap in several of their boundaries, and continue to cause conflict between the two separate treaty bands (nowadays two First Nations).

Not all members of the Dene and Tłįchǫ communities agreed with or signed these treaties. In the fall of 1992, the Tłįchǫ submitted their own regional claim to the Canadian government. Negotiations were scheduled to begin in 1994 between the Yellowknife B Band (Treaty No. 8 Dogrib) and the Dog Rib Rae Band (Treaty No. 11 Dogrib), but the Yellowknife B Band refused to enter into negotiations. This complicated matters, as both treaty groups had land boundaries that overlapped each other. Self-governance seemed to be the issue between the two groups, as both wanted to have their say in the agreement. This halted the negotiations in 1994 while the Canadian government explored the boundary and self-government issue. A new mandate in April 1997 allowed negotiation of a "joint land claims and self-government agreement with the Dogrib Treaty 11 Council" (Treaty No. 11 Dogrib). In 1999, the Agreement-in-Principle was available for Dogrib approval and was accepted on January 7, 2000. Ninety-three percent of the Dog Rib Rae Band (Treaty No. 11 Dogrib) turned out to vote with over 84% voting for the agreement. After several community discussions and revisions, in March 2003 the Chief Negotiators initialed the agreement.

Tłįchǫ First Nations

Yellowknives Dene First Nation (formerly Yellowknife B Band) 
The Yellowknife B Band (Treaty No. 8 Dogrib) formed the Yellowknives Dene First Nation in 1991 following the collapse of this territorial-wide comprehensive land claim negotiation. They currently negotiate a land claim settlement for their lands as part of the Akaitcho Land Claim Process by the Akaitcho Territory Government. The Yellowknives Dene First Nation (known by themselves as Weledeh Yellowknives Dene) is the umbrella organization for the Dettah Yellowknives Dene First Nation (or  – 'Burnt Point' in Tłįchǫ, referring to a traditional Dene fishing camp) and Ndilǫ Yellowknives Dene First Nation. They speak the Dettah-Ndilǫ dialect of Tłįchǫ and are descendants of Tłįchǫ, Yellowknives and Chipewyan.

Tlicho Government (formerly Dog Rib Rae Band)

The Tlicho Agreement 
The act of signing the agreement began the ratification process for the Tlicho Agreement. On Thursday, August 4, 2005, the Tlicho Agreement went into full effect, "The first official day of the Tlicho Government and the Tlicho community governments" (Tlicho Effective Date). On August 25, 2003, they signed a land claims agreement, also called Tłįchǫ, as the Tlicho Government, with the Government of Canada. The agreement will cede a  area between Great Bear Lake and Great Slave Lake in the NWT to Tłįchǫ ownership. The territory includes the communities of Behchokǫ̀, Gamèti, Wekweeti and Whatì along with Diavik Diamond Mine and Ekati Diamond Mine. The four Tłįchǫ bands, Dog Rib Rae First Nation, Wha Ti First Nation, Gameti First Nation and Dechi Laot'i First Nations, as well as their umbrella Dogrib Treaty 11 Council, ceased to exist on August 4, 2005 and have been succeeded by the Tlicho Government.

The Tłįchǫ will have their own legislative bodies in the area's four communities, of which the chiefs must be Tłįchǫ, though anyone may run for councillor and vote. The legislatures will have, among other authorities, the power to collect taxes, levy resource royalties, which currently go to the federal government, and control hunting, fishing and industrial development.

The Tłįchǫ will also receive payments of $152 million over 15 years and annual payments of approximately $3.5 million.

The federal government will retain control of criminal law, as it does across Canada, and the NWT will control services such as health care and education.

This land-claims process took twenty years to conclude. A similar process with the Inuit in the NWT brought about the creation of the new territory of Nunavut. Though Tłįchǫ will not be a separate territory, the extent of its powers has invited comparisons both with the birth of Nunavut and with the creation of the NWT government in 1967.

Notable Tłįchǫ persons 
 Dahti Tsetso, Dehcho First Nation environmentalist and educator
 Richard Van Camp, writer, author of The Lesser Blessed
 Bear Lake Chief (Kʼaàwidaà, “highest trader”, also known as Francis Yambi, or Eyambi,ʼEyirape, 1852-1913), was perhaps the most well known of the Tłįchǫ trading chiefs, in 1872, he married Emma Kowea (b. 1854) at Fort Norman (Tiłihtʼa, Tiłihtʼa Kǫ, Tulita), and together they raised nine children, member of the Sahtigotʼin ( “Great Bear Lake People”) regional group he rose to become a prominent trading chief for Tłįchǫ groups trading at both Old Fort Rae (Nihshih Kʼe, Ninhsin Kon) and Fort Norman, is buried on an island on Lac Ste. Croix, north of the community of Gameti (Rae Lakes)
 Chief Edzo, great Tłįchǫ  (“people's trader, i.e. trading chief”), participated in a famous peace treaty at Mesa Lake in 1825 (or 1829) with the great Yellowknife trading chief, Akaitcho, ending the long period of hostility and warfare between the Yellowknives and Tłįchǫ
 Dzemi (Ekawi Dzimi, called by Frank Russel: Jimmie), Tłįchǫ  (trading chief) at Old Fort Rae, head of the donek'awi at Old Fort Rae,  (leader) of the Dechi Laotʼi (“Edge of the Woods People”)
 Ewainghan (called by Frank Russel: Rabesca), Tłįchǫ  (trading chief) at Old Fort Rae,  (leader) of the Etʼaa gotʼin (“People Next to Another People”)
 Drygeese (also known as Dry Geese), Tłįchǫ  (trading chief) at Fort Resolution (Įndàà, Deninoo Kue), signed as spokesman of the Tłįchǫ and Yellowknives, later known as Yellowknife B Band, Treaty 8 in 1900 at Fort Resolution
 Beniah, Tłįchǫ  (trading chief) at Fort Resolution
 Little Crapeau, Tłįchǫ  (trading chief) at Fort Resolution
 Chief Castor, Tłįchǫ  (trading chief) at Fort Resolution
 Chief Monfwi, ( “Small Mouth”, May 21, 1866 1936), Tłįchǫ  (trading chief), became  (“leader”) of the Dechi Laotʼi (“Edge of the Woods People”), was appointed by the Tłįchǫ leadership to represent all Tłįchǫ groups, signed Treaty 11 in 1921 for the Tłįchǫ groups, later known as Dog Rib Rae Band
 The artist James Wedzin is a member of this nation from Behchoko, Northwest Territories.
 The novel White Bird Black Bird, by Val Wake, a CBC Northern Service reporter based in Yellowknife from 1969 to 1973, tells the story of Dogrib input into the formation of the NWT Indian Brotherhood. A lot of the action is set in what was then called Rae.

See also 
 Gahcho Kue Diamond Mine Project

Notes

Further reading

 Dogrib Treaty 11 Council. Tłįchǫ Agreement Implementation Plan. [Ottawa]: Queen's Printer for Canada, 2003. 
 Football, Virginia. Dogrib Legends. Yellowknife, Canada: Curriculum Division, Dept. of Education, Northwest Territories, 1972.
 Helm, June. Prophecy and Power Among the Dogrib Indians. Studies in the anthropology of North American Indians. Lincoln: University of Nebraska Press, 1994. 
 Helm, June, Nancy Oestreich Lurie, and Gertrude Prokosch Kurath. The Dogrib Hand Game. Ottawa: [Queen's Printer], 1966.
 Helm, June, and Jordan Paper. 1996. "Prophecy and Power Among the Dogrib Indians". The Journal of Religion. 76, no. 4: 675.
 Helm, June, and Nancy Oestreich Lurie. The Subsistence Economy of the Dogrib Indians of Lac La Martre in the Mackenzie District of the Northwest Territories. Ottawa: Northern Co-ordination and Research Centre, Dept. of Northern Affairs and National Resources, 1961.
 Moffitt PM. 2004. "Colonialization: a Health Determinant for Pregnant Dogrib Women". Journal of Transcultural Nursing : Official Journal of the Transcultural Nursing Society / Transcultural Nursing Society. 15, no. 4: 323-30.
 Szathmary EJ, and N Holt. 1983. "Hyperglycemia in Dogrib Indians of the Northwest Territories, Canada: Association with Age and a Centripetal Distribution of Body Fat". Human Biology; an International Record of Research. 55, no. 2: 493–515.

External links

 Tlicho home page
 Lessons From the Land: The Idaa Trail
 Richard Van Camp's website

 
Indigenous peoples of the Subarctic
First Nations in the Northwest Territories